Salah (also Romanized as Şalāḩ; also known as Şalāt and Şelāt) is a village in Garmab Rural District, Chahardangeh District, Sari County, Mazandaran Province, Iran. At the 2006 census, its population was 122, in 24 families.

References 

Populated places in Sari County